Kishkino is a rural locality (a village) in Podlesnoye Rural Settlement, Vologodsky District, Vologda Oblast, Russia. The population was 2 as of 2002.

Geography 
The distance to Vologda is 14 km, to Ogarkovo is 1 km. Ogarkovo, Pogorelovo, Rebrovo, Medovshchikovo, Lazarevo are the nearest rural localities.

References 

Rural localities in Vologodsky District